Fred Fatiaki is a Fijian Paralympic athlete, athletics coach and official. He coached the first Fijian and Pacific Islander to ever win a gold medal at the 2012 Summer Paralympics, Iliesa Delana who he had been coaching since 2006.

In 2013 he won the Fiji Sports Awards Coach of the Year for 2012. Fatiaki has been working for the Fiji Paralympic Committee since 2008.

Fred is the older brother of Fijian rugby union player Ravai Fatiaki.

References

Living people
Fijian people of Rotuman descent
Paralympic coaches of Fiji
Coaches at the 2012 Summer Paralympics
Fijian sports coaches
Year of birth missing (living people)